Shangyun is a town in Lancang Lahu Autonomous County, Yunnan, China.

Administrative division
As of 2016, the town is divided into eleven villages: 
 Shangyun
 Balao
 Nanwa
 Manbeng
 Mengfo
 Naruan
 Nannai
 Wengban
 Mangjiao
 Nonglang
 Xiayun

History
After the establishment of the Communist State in 1949, it was known as "Shangyun District". It was officially designated a town until an administrative reorganisation in 1988.

Geography
The town is situated at northwestern Lancang Lahu Autonomous County. The town is bordered to the north by Shuangjiang Lahu, Va, Blang and Dai Autonomous County and Wendong Wa Ethnic Township, to the east by Dashan Township and Donghe Township, to the south by Fubang Township, and to the west by Mujia Township and Ankang Wa Ethnic Township.

Winter are warm, while summer are cool.

It is surrounded by mountains, notably Mount Longtanjian in the north, Mount Baishitou ( in the east), Mount Houdiyakou in the south, and Mount Chumake in the west. In the middle is a basin.

The Shangyun River flows through the town.

The Taojinhe Reservoir is a reservoir in the town, which provides drinking water and water for irrigation.

Economy
The principal industries in the town are agriculture, forestry and mineral resources. The main crops of the region are grains, followed by corns and vegetables. Banana, sugarcane, tobacco, tea, natural rubber, Zanthoxylum, mango, pineapple, and Walnut are the economic plants of this region. The region abounds with coal, copper, zinc, and manganese.

Demographics

The National Bureau of Statistics of China estimates the town's population was 45,000 in 2018.

Tourist attractions
The county is rich in Buddhist traditions. Laojiemian Temple, Chengzimian Temple, Xiachengmian Temple are major Buddhist temples in the town.  

Xiayun Christ Church is a church in the town.

The White Pagoda is a popular attraction.

Education
 Lancang No. 2 High School

Hospital
 Lancang No. 2 People's Hospital

Transportation
The China National Highway 214 passes across the town north to south.

References

Bibliography

Towns of Pu'er City
Divisions of Lancang Lahu Autonomous County